Twistor may refer to:

Math and science
 Twistor correspondence
 Twistor memory
 Twistor space
 Twistor string theory
 Twistor theory

Other uses
 Twistor (book), a 1989 novel by American writer John G. Cramer

See also
 Twister (disambiguation)